Canaries may refer to:

 Canary Islands, an archipelago in the Atlantic belonging to Spain
 Canaries, Saint Lucia, a village on the Caribbean island of Saint Lucia
 Canaries, birds in the genera Serinus and Crithagra
 Canary (court dance), a lively 16th century court dance in Europe
 "The Canaries", the nickname of several football teams
 Norwich City F.C., from England
 Hitchin Town F.C., from England
 FK Novi Sad, from Serbia
 FC Nantes, from France 
 PFC Botev Plovdiv, from Bulgaria

 Canaries (film), 1969 film by Jerome Hill
 Canaries (Arrow), an episode of Arrow

See also 
 Canary (disambiguation)
 Canarese
 Canaris (disambiguation)